Mehari is a union of Kasba Upazila in the Brahmanbaria district of Bangladesh.

Area 
Mehari Union covers an area of 5,450 acres (22.08 km2).

Location and boundaries 
Mehari Union is located in the north-western part of Kasba Upazila. It is bounded on the south by Kuti Union, on the east by Kasba West Union and Kharera Union, on the north-east by Badair Union, on the north by Mulgram Union and Kaitola South Union of Nabinagar Upazila and Andikot Union of Muradnagar Upazila of Comilla District.

Demographics 
According to the 2011 Bangladesh census, the total population of Mehari Union is 26,335. Of these, 12,179 are males and 14,158 are females. The total number of households is 5,016. The population density is about 1,194 people per square kilometer. The village-based population of this union is mentioned below:

History 
Mehari, a village in Brahmanbaria district of Bangladesh is a traditional ancient village of Mehari Union or Kasba Upazila. Even before the partition of the country in 1947, hundreds of years old buildings and archeological monuments were found here, which were lost due to disrespect and neglect.

It is believed that a wealthy merchant named Mihir Chandra lived here during the reign of the Sen dynasty. People from nearby villages used to call his house "Mihir Bari" (Mihir's house). The name "Mihir Bari" later changed the word of mouth (Mihir Bari> Mehar Bari> Mehari) to Mehari.

According to another source, the people of these three villages of Mehari, Barni and Kalsar belonged to the same family at one time. It is known that Mehari Khan, Varun Khan and Kalon Khan were named after three persons of the same family;  It is said that Varni was named after Varun Khan and Kalsar was named after Kalon Khan.

There is a traditional Kali temple in the village of Mehari. Every year a grand ceremony is held here at the puja of the traditional religious community and a fair is held at Bat tala. According to the name of this Mehari Kali Temple, the then Chairman Lalu Gonsai named the Parishad as Mehari Union Parishad.

Administrative Structure 
Mehari Union is No.2 Union Parishad (Union council) under Kasba Upazila. Administrative activities of this union are under Kasba Upazila. This union is a part of Brahmanbaria-4 constituency No. 247 of the Jatiya Sangsad. 

The villages of this union are:
 Purquil
 Mehari
 Kheora
 Jamuna
 Bahar Aata
 Ishan Nagar
 Choubeypur
 Bamutia
 Shimrail
 Vallabhpur

Office 
The office of this union is located in Ishan Nagar village in ward 1. The Union Parishad (council) office is an "L"-shaped two-storey building.

Education 
According to the 2011 census, Mehari Union has an average literacy rate of 47.4%.

Educational Institutions 
 Purquil Gausia Habibia Fazil Madrasa
 Meheri Obadia Fazil Madrasa
 Kheora Ma Anandamoyee High School
 Kheora Government Primary School
 Jamuna Government Primary School
 Ishan Nagar Government Primary School 
 Chaubepur Government Primary School

Canals and rivers 
 Rajar khal. (King's canal)
 Oder khal.
 Boro khal.

Village Markets 
 Kheora market
 Jamuna Bazar
 Purquil Market
 Mehari Bazar
 Shimrail Bazaar

References

Unions of Kasba Upazila
Unions of Brahmanbaria District
Kasba Upazila